Donald Raymie Muzquiz (born December 21, 1960) is an American animation director. He has directed several episodes of Futurama, and served as supervising director on the Cartoon Network series Clarence during the first season. He has also directed episodes of Drawn Together, Duckman, Hey Arnold!, Sit Down, Shut Up, and Rugrats. He was also a storyboard artist on Futurama, Aaahh!!! Real Monsters, Despicable Me and The Simpsons. Also, he directed the television movie The Electric Piper.

Filmography

Film

Television

References

External links

 

American animated film directors
American animators
1960 births
Living people
Place of birth missing (living people)
American storyboard artists
American television directors